The 2006 CFL season is considered to be the 53rd season in modern-day Canadian football, although it is officially the 49th Canadian Football League season.

CFL News in 2006
It was announced on April 9, 2006 that the CFL had suspended the operations of the Ottawa Renegades for the 2006 season,  thus making the CFL an eight team league and moving the Winnipeg Blue Bombers to the East Division for at least the 2006 season. On April 12, 2006 an Ottawa Dispersal Draft was held where the remaining eight teams chose players from the Ottawa Renegades' roster. On September 28, it was confirmed that Ottawa would return no sooner than the 2008 season, to give potential new owners enough time to set up the new franchise.

Ultimately, the Renegades never returned. They would not be replaced until the formation of the Ottawa Redblacks, who began play for the 2014 CFL season.

The 2006 season is the first season where teams will be able to challenge officials' calls using instant replay. The CFL's replay system seems to be largely modelled on the one used in the NFL although there are some differences.

A new salary cap and salary management system (SMS) was adopted for the 2006 season, although the enforcement part of the new system will not take effect until the 2007 season. The cap for the 2007 season has been set at $4.05 million.

It was announced on July 5, 2006 that Tom Wright, commissioner of the CFL, had informed the CFL that he would not be seeking a contract extension as league commissioner after this season, thus ending his tenure as the 11th CFL commissioner. Prior to his final day in the office, Wright presented the Grey Cup to the BC Lions as they defeated the Montreal Alouettes in the championship game at Winnipeg's Canad Inns Stadium. Commissioner Wright and TSN President Phil King announced a landmark five-year multi-platform agreement between the League and TSN to commence in 2008 on December 20.

In June 2006 the league announced the launch of CFL Broadband, an internet streaming service designed to provide fans with another media platform, in addition to TSN and CBC broadcasts, to watch live CFL games.

On October 26, 2006 Hugh Campbell stepped down as CEO of the Eskimos.

The number of TDs scored on kicking or punting plays dropped dramatically in 2006, which many attributed to stricter rules on blocking. There were 16 such TDs in 2005, and just 3 in the 2006 season.

Records and Milestones
Damon Allen became pro-football's all-time passing yardage leader on September 4 by surpassing Warren Moon's total of 70,553 yards (in both the CFL and NFL combined) as the Toronto Argonauts defeated the Hamilton Tiger-Cats, 40–6.

Terry Vaughn became the all-time receptions leader, surpassing Darren Flutie with 973 on July 14. Then on September 22, Vaughn became the first football receiver in CFL history to record 1,000 all-time receptions.

On October 14, Byron Parker sets a new CFL single-season record for most interception return yardage with 342 on a 75-yard interception return for a touchdown in Edmonton.

On October 20, Mike O'Shea becomes the first Canadian and third player (behind Willie Pless and Alondra Johnson) to have had 1,000 career tackles.

The Edmonton Eskimos' streak of 34 straight years in the playoffs came to an end in 2006.

Regular season
Note: GP = Games Played, W = Wins, L = Losses, T = Ties, PF = Points For, PA = Points Against, Pts = Points

Teams in bold finished in playoff positions.

Notes
 Ottawa Renegades have suspended operations for the 2006 season.''

Grey Cup playoffs

The BC Lions are the 2006 Grey Cup Champions, defeating the Montreal Alouettes 25–14 at Winnipeg's Canad Inns Stadium. It was the first Grey Cup for the Lions since they defeated the same Alouettes in the 88th Grey Cup game in 2000.
The Lions' Dave Dickenson (QB) was named the Grey Cup's Most Valuable Player and the Lions' Paul McCallum (K) was the Grey Cup's Most Valuable Canadian.

Playoff bracket

CFL Leaders
 CFL Passing Leaders
 CFL Rushing Leaders
 CFL Receiving Leaders

2006 CFL All-Stars

Offence
 QB – Ricky Ray, Edmonton Eskimos
 WR – Geroy Simon, BC Lions
 WR – Milt Stegall, Winnipeg Blue Bombers
 WR – Arland Bruce III, Toronto Argonauts
 WR – Jason Tucker, Edmonton Eskimos
 RB – Joffrey Reynolds, Calgary Stampeders
 RB – Charles Roberts, Winnipeg Blue Bombers
 OT – Gene Makowsky, Saskatchewan Roughriders
 OT – Rob Murphy, BC Lions
 OG – Scott Flory, Montreal Alouettes
 OG – Jay McNeil, Calgary Stampeders
 C – Jeremy O'Day, Saskatchewan Roughriders

Defence
 DE – Brent Johnson, BC Lions
 DE – Fred Perry, Saskatchewan Roughriders
 DT – Doug Brown, Winnipeg Blue Bombers
 DT – Tyrone Williams, BC Lions
 LB – Brian Clark, Calgary Stampeders
 LB – Otis Floyd, BC Lions
 LB – Barrin Simpson, Winnipeg Blue Bombers
 DB – Korey Banks, BC Lions
 DB – Eddie Davis, Saskatchewan Roughriders
 CB – Byron Parker, Toronto Argonauts
 CB – Coby Rhinehart, Calgary Stampeders
 DS – Barron Miles, BC Lions

Special teams
 K – Sandro DeAngelis, Calgary Stampeders
 P – Noel Prefontaine, Toronto Argonauts
 ST – Albert Johnson III, Winnipeg Blue Bombers

2006 Western All-Stars

Offence
 QB – Ricky Ray, Edmonton Eskimos
 WR – Geroy Simon, BC Lions
 WR – Matt Dominguez, Saskatchewan Roughriders
 WR – Nik Lewis, Calgary Stampeders
 WR – Jason Tucker, Edmonton Eskimos
 RB – Joffrey Reynolds, Calgary Stampeders
 RB – Kenton Keith, Saskatchewan Roughriders
 OT – Gene Makowsky, Saskatchewan Roughriders
 OT – Rob Murphy, BC Lions
 OG – Dan Comiskey, Edmonton Eskimos
 OG – Jay McNeil, Calgary Stampeders
 C – Jeremy O'Day, Saskatchewan Roughriders

Defence
 DE – Brent Johnson, BC Lions
 DE – Fred Perry, Saskatchewan Roughriders
 DT – Aaron Hunt, BC Lions
 DT – Tyrone Williams, BC Lions
 LB – Brian Clark, Calgary Stampeders
 LB – Otis Floyd, BC Lions
 LB – Reggie Hunt, Saskatchewan Roughriders
 DB – Korey Banks, BC Lions
 DB – Eddie Davis, Saskatchewan Roughriders
 CB – Dante Marsh, BC Lions
 CB – Coby Rhinehart, Calgary Stampeders
 DS – Barron Miles, BC Lions

Special teams
 K – Sandro DeAngelis, Calgary Stampeders
 P – Burke Dales, Calgary Stampeders
 ST – Carl Kidd, BC Lions

2006 Eastern All-Stars

Offence
 QB – Anthony Calvillo, Montreal Alouettes
 WR – Ben Cahoon, Montreal Alouettes
 WR – Milt Stegall, Winnipeg Blue Bombers
 WR – Arland Bruce III, Toronto Argonauts
 WR – Kerry Watkins, Montreal Alouettes
 RB – Robert Edwards, Montreal Alouettes
 RB – Charles Roberts, Winnipeg Blue Bombers
 OT – Bernard Williams, Toronto Argonauts
 OT – Jerome Davis, Toronto Argonauts
 OG – Scott Flory, Montreal Alouettes
 OG – Jude St. John, Toronto Argonauts
 C – Bryan Chiu, Montreal Alouettes

Defence
 DE – Gavin Walls, Winnipeg Blue Bombers
 DE – Jonathan Brown, Toronto Argonauts
 DT – Ed Philion, Montreal Alouettes
 DT – Doug Brown, Winnipeg Blue Bombers
 LB – Kevin Eiben, Toronto Argonauts
 LB – Tim Strickland, Montreal Alouettes
 LB – Barrin Simpson, Winnipeg Blue Bombers
 DB – Tay Cody Hamilton Tiger-Cats
 DB – Kenny Wheaton, Toronto Argonauts
 CB – Byron Parker, Toronto Argonauts
 CB – Jordan Younger, Toronto Argonauts
 DS – Orlondo Steinauer, Toronto Argonauts

Special teams
 K – Damon Duval, Montreal Alouettes
 P – Noel Prefontaine, Toronto Argonauts
 ST – Albert Johnson III, Winnipeg Blue Bombers

2006 Intergold CFLPA All-Stars

Offence
QB – Henry Burris, Calgary Stampeders
OT – Gene Makowsky, Saskatchewan Roughriders
OT – Bernard Williams, Toronto Argonauts
OG – Dan Comiskey,	Edmonton Eskimos
OG – Scott Flory, Montreal Alouettes
C – Bryan Chiu, Montreal Alouettes
RB – Joffrey Reynolds, Calgary Stampeders
FB – Chris Szarka, Saskatchewan Roughriders
SB – Geroy Simon, BC Lions
SB – Milton Stegall, Winnipeg Blue Bombers
WR – Arland Bruce, Toronto Argonauts
WR – Kerry Watkins, Montreal Alouettes

Defence
DE – Brent Johnson, BC Lions
DE – Fred Perry, Saskatchewan Roughriders
DT – Doug Brown, Winnipeg Blue Bombers
DT – Tyrone Williams, BC Lions
LB – Barrin Simpson, Winnipeg Blue Bombers
LB – Otis Floyd, BC Lions
LB – Brian Clark, Calgary Stampeders
CB – Tay Cody, Hamilton Tiger-Cats
CB – Omarr Morgan, Saskatchewan Roughriders
HB – Korey Banks, BC Lions
HB – Eddie Davis, Saskatchewan Roughriders
S – Barron Miles, BC Lions

Special teams
K – Sandro DeAngelis, Calgary Stampeders
ST – Sandro DeAngelis, Calgary Stampeders
P – Damon Duval, Montreal Alouettes

Head coach
 Wally Buono, BC Lions

2006 Rogers CFL Awards
 CFL's Most Outstanding Player Award – Geroy Simon (SB), BC Lions
 CFL's Most Outstanding Canadian Award – Brent Johnson (DE), BC Lions
 CFL's Most Outstanding Defensive Player Award – Brent Johnson (DE), BC Lions
 CFL's Most Outstanding Offensive Lineman Award – Rob Murphy (OG), BC Lions
 CFL's Most Outstanding Rookie Award – Aaron Hunt (DT), BC Lions
 CFL's Most Outstanding Special Teams Award – Sandro DeAngelis (K), Calgary Stampeders
 CFLPA's Outstanding Community Service Award – Mark Washington (DB), BC Lions
 Rogers Fans' Choice Award – Geroy Simon (SB), BC Lions
 CFL's Scotiabank Coach of the Year – Wally Buono, BC Lions
 Commissioner's Award - Winnipeg Blue Bombers Ghosts
 Hugh Campbell Distinguished Leadership Award - Hugh Campbell, Edmonton Eskimos

References

Canadian Football League seasons
CFL